Amy Harper may refer to:

Amy Merania Harper, New Zealand photographer
Amy Harper (swimmer); see Swimming at the 2011 Island Games
Amy Harper Bellafonte